The 1983 CFL season is considered to be the 30th season in modern-day Canadian football, although it is officially the 26th Canadian Football League season.

CFL News in 1983
The CFL re-signed with Carling O'Keefe Breweries to another record television contract worth $33 million to cover a three-year period from 1983 to 1986.

The BC Lions opened their new stadium, BC Place this season, and with it, introduced shorter endzones to its stadium (20 yards in length as opposed to the then-standard 25 yards). This was because the floor of the stadium was too short to accommodate the 25 yard endzones; the shorter endzone length would become standard in the CFL three years later, in 1986.

The league's attendance levels reached an all-time high for all football games with 2,856,031. The Grey Cup game between the Toronto Argonauts and the BC Lions was played in front of 59,345 football fans at BC Place Stadium (the first lion gross gate).

In addition, CBC, CTV and Radio-Canada's coverage of the Grey Cup game attracted the largest viewing audience in television history for a Canadian sports program with 8,118,000.

The Toronto Argonauts won their first Grey Cup Championship since 1952. This would be the last season all three of the CFL's Ontario-based teams qualified for the playoffs until the 2015 season.

Terry Greer set a pro football record for most receiving yards with 2,003.

Regular season standings

Final regular season standings
Note: GP = Games Played, W = Wins, L = Losses, T = Ties, PF = Points For, PA = Points Against, Pts = Points

Bold text means that they have clinched the playoffs.
BC and Toronto have first round byes.

Grey Cup playoffs

The Toronto Argonauts are the 1983 Grey Cup champions, defeating the BC Lions, 18–17, in front of their home crowd at Vancouver's BC Place Stadium. This was Toronto's first championship in 31 years, ending the league's longest drought at that time. The Argonauts' Joe Barnes (QB) was named the Grey Cup's Most Valuable Player on Offence and Carl Brazley (DB) was named Grey Cup's Most Valuable Player on Defence.  The Lions' Rick Klassen (DT) was named the Grey Cup's Most Valuable Canadian.

Playoff bracket

CFL Leaders
 CFL Passing Leaders
 CFL Rushing Leaders
 CFL Receiving Leaders

1983 CFL All-Stars

Offence
QB – Warren Moon, Edmonton Eskimos
RB – Alvin "Skip" Walker, Ottawa Rough Riders
RB – Johnny Shepherd, Hamilton Tiger-Cats
SB – Tom Scott, Edmonton Eskimos
SB – Ron Robinson, Montreal Concordes
WR – Brian Kelly, Edmonton Eskimos
WR – Terry Greer, Toronto Argonauts
C – John Bonk, Winnipeg Blue Bombers
OG – Leo Blanchard, Edmonton Eskimos
OG – Rudy Phillips, Ottawa Rough Riders
OT – John Blain, BC Lions
OT – Kevin Powell, Ottawa Rough Riders

Defence
DT – Mack Moore, BC Lions
DT – Gary Dulin, Ottawa Rough Riders
DE – Greg Marshall, Ottawa Rough Riders
DE – Rick Mohr, Toronto Argonauts
MLB – Danny Bass, Calgary Stampeders
LB – Delbert Fowler, Montreal Concordes
LB – Vince Goldsmith, Saskatchewan Roughriders
DB – Harry Skipper, Montreal Concordes
DB – Kerry Parker, BC Lions
DB – Larry Crawford, BC Lions
DB – Richard Hall, Calgary Stampeders
DB – Carl Brazley, Toronto Argonauts
DB – Paul Bennett, Winnipeg Blue Bombers

Special teams
P/K – Lui Passaglia, BC Lions

1983 Eastern All-Stars

Offence
QB – Condredge Holloway, Toronto Argonauts
RB – Alvin "Skip" Walker, Ottawa Rough Riders
RB – Johnny Shepherd, Hamilton Tiger-Cats
SB – Emanuel Tolbert, Toronto Argonauts
SB – Ron Robinson, Montreal Concordes
WR – Keith Baker, Hamilton Tiger-Cats
WR – Terry Greer, Toronto Argonauts
C – Larry Tittley, Ottawa Rough Riders
OG – Dan Ferrone, Toronto Argonauts
OG – Rudy Phillips, Ottawa Rough Riders
OT – Miles Gorrell, Montreal Concordes
OT – Kevin Powell, Ottawa Rough Riders

Defence
DT – Franklin King, Toronto Argonauts
DT – Gary Dulin, Ottawa Rough Riders
DE – Greg Marshall, Ottawa Rough Riders
DE – Rick Mohr, Toronto Argonauts
MLB – Darrell Nicholson, Toronto Argonauts
LB – Delbert Fowler, Montreal Concordes
LB – Rick Sowieta, Ottawa Rough Riders
LB – William Mitchell, Toronto Argonauts
DB – Harry Skipper, Montreal Concordes
DB – Leroy Paul, Toronto Argonauts
DB – Howard Fields, Hamilton Tiger-Cats
DB – Darrell Wilson, Toronto Argonauts
DB – Carl Brazley, Toronto Argonauts
DB – Ken McEachern, Toronto Argonauts

Special teams
P/K – Bernie Ruoff, Hamilton Tiger-Cats

1983 Western All-Stars

Offence
QB – Warren Moon, Edmonton Eskimos
RB – Willard Reaves, Winnipeg Blue Bombers
RB – Ray Crouse, Calgary Stampeders
SB – Tom Scott, Edmonton Eskimos
SB – Chris DeFrance, Saskatchewan Roughriders
WR – Brian Kelly, Edmonton Eskimos
WR – Mervyn Fernandez, BC Lions
C – John Bonk, Winnipeg Blue Bombers
OG – Leo Blanchard, Edmonton Eskimos
OG – Roger Aldag, Saskatchewan Roughriders
OT – John Blain, BC Lions
OT – Dave Kirzinger, Calgary Stampeders

Defence
DT – Mack Moore, BC Lions
DT – Randy Trautman, Calgary Stampeders
DE – James Parker, Edmonton Eskimos
DE – Tony Norman, Winnipeg Blue Bombers
MLB – Danny Bass, Calgary Stampeders
LB – James West, Calgary Stampeders
LB – Vince Goldsmith, Saskatchewan Roughriders
DB – Dave Shaw, Winnipeg Blue Bombers
DB – Kerry Parker, BC Lions
DB – Larry Crawford, BC Lions
DB – Richard Hall, Calgary Stampeders
DB – Paul Bennett, Winnipeg Blue Bombers

Special teams
P/K – Lui Passaglia, BC Lions
P/K – Trevor Kennerd, Winnipeg Blue Bombers

1983 CFL Awards
CFL's Most Outstanding Player Award – Warren Moon (QB), Edmonton Eskimos
CFL's Most Outstanding Canadian Award – Paul Bennett (DB), Winnipeg Blue Bombers
CFL's Most Outstanding Defensive Player Award – Greg Marshall (DE), Ottawa Rough Riders
CFL's Most Outstanding Offensive Lineman Award – Rudy Phillips (OG), Ottawa Rough Riders
CFL's Most Outstanding Rookie Award – Johnny Shepherd (RB), Hamilton Tiger-Cats
CFLPA's Outstanding Community Service Award – Henry Waszczuk (C), Hamilton Tiger-Cats
CFL's Coach of the Year – Cal Murphy, Winnipeg Blue Bombers

References 

CFL
Canadian Football League seasons